Sidgwick & Jackson is an imprint of book publishing company Pan Macmillan. Formerly it was an independent publisher; as such it was founded in Britain in 1908. Its notable early authors include poet Rupert Brooke and novelist E.M. Forster. In more recent times it helped launch the careers of Lynda La Plante, Shirley Conran and Judith Krantz.

The Managing Director from 1968 to 1995 was William Armstrong; the company and Armstrong were said to have encouraged individuality and entrepreneurship among staff. Armstrong was also the father of the singer Dido.

Subject interests
Commercial and popular non-fiction.
High-profile biography.
History of popular culture.
Sidgwick Military list: supported in association with the Imperial War Museum and National Army Museum.

References

External links
Sidgwick & Jackson's official web page

Book publishing companies of the United Kingdom
Publishing companies based in London
Holtzbrinck Publishing Group
Publishing companies established in 1908
1908 establishments in the United Kingdom